The Haunting Hour may refer to:

The Haunting Hour: Chills in the Dead of Night, 2002 anthology by novelist R.L. Stine
The Haunting Hour: Don't Think About It, 2007 film
The Haunting Hour: The Series, 2010–2014 TV series